Manzanita is an album by American guitarist Tony Rice, released in 1979. It is credited to the Tony Rice Unit.

Manzanita is considered a breakthrough album that combines traditional bluegrass and folk songs with more progressive playing. It shows not only Tony Rice's instrumental and vocal talent, but also his strong all-star back-up band, consisting of Sam Bush, Ricky Skaggs, Jerry Douglas, David Grisman, Darol Anger and Todd Phillips.  The album is notable in that it does not feature a banjo.

Track listing 
 "Old Train" (Herb Pedersen) – 2:08
 "Manzanita" (Tony Rice) – 4:46
 "Little Sadie" (Traditional) – 2:45
 "Blackberry Blossom" (Traditional) – 2:36
 "Nine Pound Hammer" (Merle Travis) – 2:36
 "Hold Whatcha Got" (Jimmy Martin) – 2:45
 "Blue Railroad Train" (Alton Delmore, Rabon Delmore) – 3:18
 "Ginseng Sullivan" (Norman Blake) – 3:05
 "Midnight On The Stormy Deep" (Traditional) – 4:05
 "I Hope You Have Learned" (James Baker, Bill Carrigan) – 2:33
 "Stony Point" (Traditional) – 2:48
 "Home from the Forest" (Gordon Lightfoot) – 4:10

Personnel 
 Tony Rice – guitar, vocals
 Darol Anger – violin
 Sam Bush – mandolin, violin, vocals
 David Grisman – mandolin
 Jerry Douglas – dobro
 Ricky Skaggs – mandolin, violin, vocals
 Todd Phillips – bass
Production notes
 Tony Rice – producer
 Bill Wolf – engineer, mixing

References

External links 
 Songs from Manzanita on YouTube
 Tony and Wyatt Rice play and explain chords on song "Manzanita"
 Manzanita on www.youtube.com
 Nine Pound Hammer
 Little Sadie
 Blue Railroad Train
 Home from the Forest

1979 albums
Tony Rice albums
Rounder Records albums